Craig Cameron (born 1949) is an American horse trainer. He won the Road to the Horse colt-starting contest in 2010 and has been inducted into the Texas Cowboy Hall of Fame.

Life
Cameron was born in 1949 in Texas and grew up on a ranch. He currently lives in Bluff Dale, Texas, with his wife.

Career
Cameron competed in rodeo for many years. He rode at the Professional Rodeo Cowboys Association level and specialized in bull riding. Cameron later began training horses and giving clinics on reining, training young horses and Western riding. He also founded the Extreme Cowboy Race and hosts a program on RFD-TV. In 2010, Cameron won the Road to the Horse competition.
Cameron has been inducted into the Texas Cowboy Hall of Fame.

References

Western horse trainers
1949 births
Living people
Bull riders